Ōwada Station is the name of multiple train stations in Japan:

 Ōwada Station (Hokkaido) (大和田駅)
 Ōwada Station (Nara) (大輪田駅)
 Ōwada Station (Osaka) (大和田駅)
 Ōwada Station (Saitama) (大和田駅)
 Keisei-Ōwada Station (京成大和田駅)